Les Rois mages (or The Three Magis, its unofficial English title) is a French comedy film released in 2001, made by Bernard Campan and Didier Bourdon. They also star in the film, playing the roles of Balthazar and Melchior respectively. Pascal Légitimus, the third member of the humorist group Les Inconnus, also stars in the film as Caspar.

Cast
 Didier Bourdon as Balthazar
 Bernard Campan as Melchior
 Pascal Légitimus as Saint Caspar
 Eriq Ebouaney as Babar
 Jean Dell as The receptionist
 Didier Flamand

Synopsis
The Biblical Magi find themselves in Paris in modern times, and become a media sensation.

References

External links
 IMDb entry

2001 films
French comedy films
Films directed by Didier Bourdon
2000s French films